The 1901–02 WPHL season was the fifth season of operation for the Western Pennsylvania Hockey League. Three Pittsburgh-area teams competed in the season, in which all games were played at the Duquesne Gardens. The season concluded with the Pittsburgh Keystones having the best record in the league and being named league champions. It would be the team's only league title.

In the summer of 1902 Keystones' player Harry Peel admitted that he was paid $35 a week to play in the league. According to Peel "[The Keystones] make no bones whatever about paying men. If they do not pay them, they give them fake positions." Peel was later suspended by the Ontario Hockey Association and his appeal was rejected on December 10, 1903 and again on November 30, 1904. However, by the 1902–03 season the WPHL, was known as a fully professional league.

Final standings

References

 

Western Pennsylvania Hockey League seasons
WPHL